Alice Eileen Wearne (30 January 1912 –  7 July 2007) was an Australian sprinter. She competed in the 1932 Summer Olympics, and won gold and bronze medals at the 1938 British Empire Games.

Athletic career

Wearne was selected in  the Australian Olympic team as a sprinter and was the second woman selected to represent Australia in athletics at the Olympic Games after Edith Robinson. She competed in the 100 metre sprint competition finishing fourth in her heat.

Wearne continued to participate in athletic events in Australia during the 1930s and won New South Wales and Australian championships enjoying a healthy rivalry with Robinson. However, she did not compete in the 1934 British Empire Games or 1936 Summer Olympics.  She entered the 1938 British Empire Games which were held in Sydney.  Wearne finished third in the 220 yard sprint behind fellow Australians Decima Norman and Jean Coleman. She was a member of the 440 yard relay gold medal team with Norman.  Wearne was the first woman to represent Australia at both the Olympics and British Empire Games with Victorian high jumper Doris Carter.

After athletics

Wearne continued to be active in the Olympic movement in Australia.  She lived to be 95 making her Australia's longest lived Olympian before her death in July 2007.

References

1912 births
2007 deaths
Australian female sprinters
Olympic athletes of Australia
Athletes (track and field) at the 1932 Summer Olympics
Athletes (track and field) at the 1938 British Empire Games
Commonwealth Games gold medallists for Australia
Commonwealth Games bronze medallists for Australia
Commonwealth Games medallists in athletics
Sportswomen from New South Wales
Athletes from Sydney
Olympic female sprinters
20th-century Australian women
21st-century Australian women
Medallists at the 1938 British Empire Games